Stoutsburg can refer to:

Stoutsburg, Indiana
Stoutsburg, New Jersey